The Golden Horse Award for Best Leading Actor is given at the Golden Horse Film Awards.

Hong Kong actor Tony Leung Chiu-wai has won the most Best Leading Actor awards with 3 times. He won the award in the 31st, 40th and 41st awards ceremony with Chungking Express, Infernal Affairs, and Lust, Caution. Leung also holds the record for having nominated in this category for 7 times.

Records 

The following individuals received two or more Best Actor awards:

The following individuals received five or more Best Actor nominations:

Winners and nominees

1960s

1970s

1980s

1990s

2000s

2010s

2020s

References

External links 
 Official website 
 Official website 

Golden Horse Film Awards
Film awards for lead actor